Cryptych was a bi-monthly magazine first published in July 1993 by ILM International Inc. It lasted eight issues.

Description
Cryptych edited by JM White, featured articles on fantasy, speculative fiction and roleplaying games and interviews with writers and notable people in the games industry, including Ed Greenwood, RA Salvatore, Wes Craven, Terry Brooks, John Carpenter, Garth Ennis, William Gibson, Frederik Pohl, Dave Duncan, Dennis Muren, Jaron Lanier, and Richard Garfield. Original cover art included three works by NeNe Thomas. The magazine also included games company newsletters, including the Wizards of the Coast newsletter that contained some of the first information on Magic: The Gathering. Later issues of the magazine would contain extensive coverage of Magic: The Gathering. 

Eight issues of Cryptych were published before the magazine folded in the fall of 1994.

Reception
In the December 1994 edition of Dragon (Issue 212), Allen Varney found the magazine unfocussed, calling it "a fascinating mess — a lunar mountain range of articles, starkly uneven, weirdly arresting." Varney concluded "Anyone can find something worthwhile in this magazine, and it will certainly find a focus over time, but for now I find this brilliant hodgepodge quite cr — uh, baffling."

References

External links
CRYPTYCH 1/I 

Photos of all Eight Cryptych Magazine Covers.

Bimonthly magazines published in the United States
Defunct science fiction magazines published in the United States
Magazines established in 1993
Magazines disestablished in 1994
Science fiction magazines established in the 1990s
Wizards of the Coast magazines